Cynthia Brock-Smith is an American government official who served as the Secretary of the District of Columbia under Mayor Vincent C. Gray from 2011 to 2014. During her tenure, she was a member of the National Association of Secretaries of State.

Education 
Brock-Smith earned a Bachelor of Arts degree in political science from the University of Maryland, College Park.

Career 
Prior to serving in city government, she was the Senior Vice President of the District of Columbia Chamber of Commerce and director of congressional relations at the United States Office of Personnel Management during the presidency of Bill Clinton. She also has worked on the staff of the United States House Committee on Appropriations and United States House Committee on Rules. She is a former president of the National Forum for Black Public Administrators.

A member of the Democratic Party, she served as Deputy Director of the Committee on Rules at two of her party's national conventions. Since 2014, Brock-Smith has served as Assistant Vice President for External Affairs at Howard University.

References

Year of birth missing (living people)
Living people
Secretaries of the District of Columbia
University of Maryland, College Park alumni
Women in Washington, D.C., politics
21st-century American women politicians
21st-century American politicians